DC Special Series was an umbrella title for one-shots and special issues published by DC Comics between 1977 and 1981. Each issue featured a different character and was often in a different format than the issue before it. DC Special Series was published in four different formats: Dollar Comics, 48 page giants, digests, and treasury editions. Neither the umbrella title nor the numbering system appear on the cover; the title "DC Special Series" appeared only on the first page in the indicia. Most issues featured new material, but eight issues were reprints of previously published material.

Publication history 
DC Special Series was preceded by the theme-based reprint title DC Special, which ceased publication the month before DC Special Series debuted. The first issue included "The Dead on Arrival Conspiracy", a Batman vs. Kobra story by Martin Pasko, Michael Netzer (Nasser), and Joe Rubinstein originally scheduled for the unpublished Kobra #8. DC Special Series #1 also included the story, "How to Prevent a Flash", which introduces Patty Spivot. That character would later appear in season two of The Flash TV series, portrayed by actress Shantel VanSanten.

DC Special Series started out as a biweekly title in 1977 until Spring 1978, when it became quarterly. The series went on hiatus after the Fall 1978 issue and was revived in Summer 1979. Two stories originally scheduled to appear in DC Special Series were split apart and published in other titles due to the DC Implosion.

The final three issues were in the oversized treasury format. Issue #25 was a tie-in to the Superman II film and #26 featured "Secrets of Superman's Fortress" by Roy Thomas, Ross Andru, and Romeo Tanghal. The last issue was a DC-Marvel crossover between Batman and the Hulk.

The issues

Collected editions
 The Greatest Flash Stories Ever Told includes "How to Prevent a Flash"  from DC Special Series #1, 288 pages, February 1991, 
 Kobra: Resurrection includes "The Dead on Arrival Conspiracy" from DC Special Series #1, 144 pages, February 2010, 
 Secret Society of Super Villains Vol. 2 includes DC Special Series #6, 328 pages, May 2012, 
 Deadman Book Four includes DC Special Series #8, 168 pages, January 2014, 
 Deadman Omnibus includes DC Special Series #8, 944 pages, December 2020, 
 The Flash: The Greatest Stories Ever Told includes "Beyond the Super-Speed Barrier" from DC Special Series #11, 208 pages, August 2007,  
 Legends of the Dark Knight: Marshall Rogers includes "Death Strikes at Midnight and Three" from DC Special Series #15, 496 pages, November 2011,  
 Batman Arkham: Ra’s Al Ghul includes “I Now Pronounce You Batman and Wife!” from DC Special Series #15, 232 pages, March 2019, 
 Legends of the Dark Knight: Michael Golden includes “I Now Pronounce You Batman and Wife!” from DC Special Series #15, 248 pages, June 2019, 
 The Complete Frank Miller Batman includes "Wanted: Santa Claus -- Dead or Alive!" from DC Special Series #21, 312 pages, December 1989, Longmeadow Press,  
 Superman: The Secrets of the Fortress of Solitude includes DC Special Series #26, 200 pages, May 2012,  
 The Marvel/DC Collection: Crossover Classics Volume 1 includes DC Special Series #27, 320 pages, June 1997,

See also
 DC Special
 Limited Collectors' Edition 
 List of DC Comics publications (C–F)

References

External links
 Daily Planet, volume 77, #23 house advertisement for 5 Star Super-Hero Spectacular at Mike's Amazing World of Comics
 Daily Planet, volume 77, #30 house advertisement for Superman Spectacular at Mike's Amazing World of Comics
 Daily Planet, volume 78, #29 house advertisement for Batman Spectacular at Mike's Amazing World of Comics
 Daily Planet, volume 79, #47 house advertisement for Super-Star Holiday Special at Mike's Amazing World of Comics
 
 DC Special Series at the DC Database
 DC Special Series at Mike's Amazing World of DC Comics
 

1977 comics debuts
1981 comics endings
Comic book digests
Comics anthologies
Comics by Arnold Drake
Comics by Bob Haney
Comics by Carl Wessler
Comics by Dennis O'Neil
Comics by George Kashdan
Comics by Gerry Conway
Comics by Len Wein
Comics by Michael Fleisher
Comics by Paul Kupperberg
Comics by Paul Levitz
Comics by Robert Kanigher
Comics by Roy Thomas
DC Comics one-shots
DC Comics titles
Defunct American comics